Amazar is an urban locality (urban-type settlement) in Mogochinsky District of Zabaykalsky Krai, Russia. Population:

Geography
The settlement is located by the left bank of the Amazar river at its confluence with the Chichatka,  ENE of Mogocha.

References

Notes

Sources

Urban-type settlements in Zabaykalsky Krai